Was It Something I Said? may refer to:

 Was It Something I Said? (album), 2001 album by Eytan Mirsky
 Was It Something I Said? (TV series), 2013 British gameshow
 "Was It Something I Said", a song by Orchestral Manoeuvres in the Dark from the album Sugar Tax